Asuroides atricraspeda is a moth of the family Erebidae. It was described by George Hampson in 1914. It is found in the Democratic Republic of the Congo, Ghana, Kenya and Sierra Leone.

References

Moths described in 1914
Nudariina
Moths of Africa
Insects of West Africa